The Traditionalist Mexican-American Catholic Church (Iglesia Católica Tradicionalista mexicana-estadounidense), sometimes known as the Traditionalist Mexico-USA Tridentine Catholic Church, was an independent Catholic church in North America. They broke away from the Catholic Church over their veneration of Santa Muerte. They are primarily active in the border regions of the United States and Mexico and have a particular presence among the Mexican immigrant communities in major United States cities. It was founded by David Romo Guillén, who served as its archbishop and primate. However, in 2012 he was sentenced to 66 years in prison for kidnapping, and as a result the church is now no longer operational.

Beliefs and organization
The Church follows both the Nicene Creed and the Athanasian Creed, maintains the seven sacraments, an all-male priesthood, are open to homosexuals in the faithful and, generally speaking, are socially conservative on abortion but do not practice clerical celibacy, allow contraceptives and do not require chastity before marriage. They also maintain their veneration of the Mexican folk saint Santa Muerte, which the Catholic Church had condemned as blasphemy and as Satanic. They reject Papal infallibility, the Immaculate Conception, and the Assumption of the Virgin Mary.

Church services are conducted every Sunday and attendees often invoke the name of the Santa Muerte to intercede before God, rather than other saints, and leave offerings to the folk saint. The church follow the Roman Catholic practice of baptism, holy communion, confirmations, weddings, exorcisms and the praying of rosaries.

Status in Mexico
Due to the connection between Santa Muerte and drug trafficking in Mexico, the Mexican government ruled that the Church did not have the qualifications for a religion and removed the Church from the list of officially recognized religions. Protests arose in 2006 among church members, yet the Church can legally worship without recognition from the government.

References

External links
 Official website

Christian denominations established in the 20th century
Christian denominations founded in the United States
Mexican-American culture
Independent Catholic denominations